Přehořov is a municipality and village in Tábor District in the South Bohemian Region of the Czech Republic. It has about 300 inhabitants.

Administrative parts
Villages of Hrušova Lhota and Kvasejovice are administrative parts of Přehořov.

References

Villages in Tábor District